Monster Maker is a collaborative studio album by Sharkey & C-Rayz Walz. It was released on Babygrande Records in 2007.

Title
Sharkey describes the title of the album as the breaking point in day-to-day life. He says, "I feel like the world is the monster maker and I feel like everyone, no matter how good of a family you've been raised by, or how good of a person you are, is capable of being that person that is sitting in the middle of bumper to bumper traffic for an hour one day and on the verge of going out and blasting people. Everyone has that seed in them where they're capable of doing something monster-ish."

Track listing

References

External links
 
 

2007 albums
C-Rayz Walz albums
Babygrande Records albums
Collaborative albums